HMS Active, the tenth Active, launched in 1929, was an  destroyer. She served in the Second World War, taking part in the sinking of four submarines. She was broken up in 1947.

Construction and design
Active was ordered on 6 March 1928 as a part of the first class of destroyers for the Royal Navy to be built after the First World War. The ship was laid down on 10 July 1928 at Hawthorn Leslie in Hebburn, Newcastle upon Tyne, was launched on 9 July 1929 and commissioned on 9 February 1930 with the pennant number H14, being the first of the A class to be completed.

Like the rest of the A class, Active had a main gun armament of four  guns on low angle (30 degree) mounts that were only suitable for anti-ship use, and an anti-aircraft armament of two 2-pounder (40 mm) "pom-poms". Eight  torpedo tubes were carried on two quadruple mounts, with Mark V torpedoes carried. No sonar set was initially fitted, although provision was made to fit one later, while anti-submarine armament consisted of three depth charge chutes with six depth charges carried. High speed minesweeping equipment was also fitted.

The ship was powered by two Parsons geared steam turbines fed by three Admiralty 3-drum boilers.

History

Pre-war operations
Following commissioning, Active joined the Third Destroyer Flotilla as part of the Mediterranean Fleet, remaining in the Mediterranean other than for refits until 1939. Active patrolled off the coast of Palestine in response to the Arab revolt in June 1936, and following the outbreak of the Spanish Civil War, patrolled off Spain from September 1936 to January 1937.

On 16 February 1937, Active collided with the destroyer  following failure of Actives steering gear at high speed. This time damage was more severe, and Active was under repair at Malta until June that year, when the ship joined the Second Destroyer Flotilla. Active served with the Second Flotilla until October 1938, when she went into reserve at Malta.

Second World War
At the beginning of the Second World War she joined the 13th Destroyer Flotilla based in Gibraltar and in June 1940 joined Force H. As such she took part in Operation Catapult against the French fleet in Mers El Kébir. On 31 July Active set out from Gibraltar as part of Force H for Operation Hurry in which the aircraft carrier 's aircraft attacked Cagliari in Italy as a diversion while the carrier  ferried 12 Hawker Hurricane fighter aircraft to Malta. In August 1940, she returned to British waters, joining the 12th Destroyer Flotilla for operations in the Western Approaches and with the Home Fleet. From November 1940 to March 1941 Active was refitted at Liverpool.

After completing this refit, Active joined the 3rd Destroyer Flotilla of the Home Fleet, and in May 1941 the ship participated in the hunt for the German battleship .

In 1942 she participated in the Madagascar landings (Operation Ironclad) during which on 8 May she sank the Vichy French submarine . 

Later while being based in Cape Town on 8 October she sank the German submarine  en route to Penang.

During the rest of the war the ship served as escort mainly between Great Britain and Sierra Leone after receiving increased anti-aircraft and anti-submarine armament.

In May 1947 Active was decommissioned and sold for scrap.

Citations

References

External links
 HMS Active at naval-history

 

A- and B-class destroyers
Ships built on the River Tyne
1929 ships
World War II destroyers of the United Kingdom